Fia Backström (born 1970) is a Swedish artist, writer and educator known for her multidisciplinary artworks. Backström lives and works in New York City.

Career
Backström's art practice is embraces both relational and conceptual art. Her output ranges between the production of events, exhibitions, magazine ads, posters, and conversations. In 2005 Backström staged the exhibition lesser new york in response to the MoMA PS1 MoMA exhibition Greater New York. The salon des refusés style exhibition would later be shown as part of the official Greater New York exhibition at MoMa PS1.

In 2011 she represented Sweden in the Venice Biennale.

Backström's work is included in the collection of the Whitney Museum of American Art, the RISD Museum and the Moderna Museet.

In 2018 she was awarded the prix littéraire Bernard Heidsieck - Centre Pompidou.

References

1970 births
Living people
Swedish contemporary artists
20th-century Swedish women artists
21st-century Swedish women artists